Hou Yuexi is a rear admiral (shaojiang) of the People's Liberation Army Navy (PLAN) of China. He has been assistant commander of the South Sea Fleet since July 2006. He previously served as chief of staff for the PLA Shanghai Naval Base from 1992 to 1996, as commander of the PLA Shanghai Naval Base from 1996 to 2001 and as chief of staff for the South Sea Fleet from 2002 to 2006.

References

External links

Living people
People from Yuncheng
People's Liberation Army Navy admirals
Year of birth missing (living people)